Department of Economic Development may refer to:
 Department of Economic Development (New Brunswick), Canada
 Department of Economic Development (Dubai)
 Department of Economic Development (Isle of Man)
 Department of Economic Development (South Africa)
 Georgia Department of Economic Development, U.S.

See also
 Ministry of Economic Development (disambiguation)
 Department of Economic Development, Tourism and the Arts, Tasmania
 Department of Economic Development, Jobs, Transport and Resources, Victoria, Australia